Hamid Al Kamali (Arabic:حامد الكمالي) (born 6 November 1992) is an Emirati footballer. He currently plays as a defender .

References

External links
 

1992 births
Living people
Emirati footballers
Emirati expatriate footballers
Al Wahda FC players
Valletta F.C. players
Al-Shaab CSC players
UAE Pro League players
Maltese Premier League players
Expatriate footballers in Malta
Emirati expatriate sportspeople in Malta
Association football defenders
Place of birth missing (living people)